The North Pacific is the Northern Hemisphere portion of the Pacific Ocean, Earth's largest oceanic division.

It may also refer to:

Transportation
 North Pacific (sidewheeler), a steamboat which operated in Western Canada and Alaska between 1871–1903
 North Pacific Airlines, operated in the US West Coast between 1987–1992
 North Pacific Coast Railroad, a Northern California rail line which operated between 1871–1907
 Northern Pacific Railway, a rail line in the Northern U.S. which operated between 1864–1970
 North Pacific Steamship Company
 North Pacific Yachts, a shipbuilding company founded in 2004

Nature and wildlife
 North Pacific albatross
 North Pacific frostfish
 North Pacific Current
 North Pacific Gyre
 North Pacific hake
 North Pacific High
 North Pacific Anadromous Fish Commission
 North Pacific Intermediate Water
 North Pacific Fishery Management Council
 North Pacific Fur Seal Convention of 1911
 North Pacific Marine Science Organization
 North Pacific Oscillation

Other uses
 NPC (cable system)
 North Pacific Coast Guard Agencies Forum
 North Pacific College
 North Pacific Football League
 North Pacific Group
 North Pacific Longliners Association

See also
 
 List of islands in the Pacific Ocean